Anthony Roussos (born 31 July 1997), known professionally as Hooligan Hefs, is an Australian hip-hop and EDM musician from Doonside, New South Wales.

Career

2017–present: Career beginnings
Hooligan Hefs appeared as a featured artist on Pistol Pete and Enzo's track "Ten Toes".

In February 2019, Hooligan Hefs released "The Party" and in May 2019, "No Effect" which was certified platinum in Australia in 2020.

Discography

Extended plays

Singles

As lead artist

As featured artist

Notes

Awards and nominations

APRA Awards
The APRA Awards are held in Australia and New Zealand by the Australasian Performing Right Association to recognise songwriting skills, sales and airplay performance by its members annually.

! 
|-
| 2022
| "Send It!"
| Most Performed Hip Hop/Rap Work
| 
| 
|-

ARIA Music Awards
The ARIA Music Awards is an annual ceremony presented by Australian Recording Industry Association (ARIA), which recognise excellence, innovation, and achievement across all genres of the music of Australia. They commenced in 1987.

! 
|-
| 2021|| "Send It!" || Song of the Year || 
| 
|-

References

External links
 

1997 births
Australian male rappers
Australian hip hop musicians
Australian people of Chinese descent
Australian people of Samoan descent
Living people
Rappers from Sydney